Marinduque State University (MarSU) is a public university in the Philippines. Established in 1952, the university has a main campus on Boac and three branch campuses. The university offers programs in Agriculture, Science, Technology, and Trades.

Campus
MSU consists of one main campus located at Boac, (capital of Marinduque) and three more branches located at Sta. Cruz, Torrijos and Gasan. MSU provides a learning resource center (library and multimedia services), student publication, Office of the Student Affairs (OSA) student organizations and activities, Guidance and Psychological Testing Services, Health Services (Medical and Dental), Scholarship and Financial Assistance Program, and Sports, Physical education and Recreation (SPEAR). It has services like dormitory, internet, canopy and study sheds, bulletin boards, and speech laboratory.

History 
The university was established in 1952 as the Marinduque School of Arts and Trades. An act in 1983 expanded its programs into Science and Technology, renaming it to Marinduque Institute of Science and Technology. The school was named a college in 1992, by a Republic Act that added Agriculture and Fisheries to its programs, as well as establishing its branch campuses.

In 2019, the College announced the legislature had approved its plans to become a university.

Academics 
Marinduque State University has a variety of courses and it was divided by their Campus Branches to municipalities, such as Boac Campus, Sta. Cruz Campus, Gasan Campus, and Torrijos Campus. (except the municipalities of Buenavista and Buenavista). As of 2021, it has received certificates of compliance from the Commission on Higher Education Regional Office IV-B (CHEdRO–Mimamropa) for its academic programs.

References

State universities and colleges in the Philippines
Universities and colleges in Marinduque